John Vivian Drummond Nettles, OBE, (born 11 October 1943) is an English actor and author. He is best known for his starring roles as detectives in the crime drama television series Bergerac (1981–1991) in the title role, and Midsomer Murders (1997–2011) as Detective Inspector Tom Barnaby. He has also narrated several television series.

Early life
Nettles was born in St Austell, Cornwall, in 1943. His birth mother was an Irish nurse who came to work in the United Kingdom during the Second World War. He was adopted at birth by carpenter Eric Nettles and his wife Elsie. 

As a youth he attended St Austell Grammar School. In 1962 he went to study history and philosophy at the University of Southampton, where he developed an interest in acting, and after graduation he joined the Royal Court Theatre.

Acting career
Nettles played Laertes to Tom Courtenay's Hamlet in 1969 at the University Theatre for 69 Theatre Company in Manchester. From 1969 to 1970, he was in repertory at the Northcott Theatre in Exeter, and in the latter year had his first screen role in the film One More Time. The following year he played Dr. Ian Mackenzie in the period drama A Family at War, a role he continued until 1972. Following that he had small parts in many TV programmes including The Liver Birds, Dickens of London, Robin of Sherwood and an episode of Enemy at the Door called "Officers of the Law", first broadcast in March 1978. The latter was set in Guernsey during the German occupation of the Channel Islands in the Second World War and Nettles played a police detective ordered to work for the Germans, who is anguished over the conflict between his duty and collaborating with the enemy.

In 1981 Nettles became a household name in the UK when Robert Banks Stewart cast him as States of Jersey Police officer Jim Bergerac in the crime drama Bergerac. The series ran for 87 episodes on BBC1 until 1991. Following the end of Bergerac, Nettles did five seasons with the Royal Shakespeare Company, appearing in The Winter's Tale, The Merry Wives of Windsor, Julius Caesar, Richard III and The Devil is an Ass. In 1992 he appeared in an episode of Boon, and in 1993 reprised the role of Jim Bergerac in a guest appearance in the spoof police comedy The Detectives.

In 1995 Nettles was approached by Brian True-May to play Tom Barnaby in a new murder mystery series he was to produce called Midsomer Murders. This was to be the second major role of his television career, again playing a police detective. Midsomer Murders was an immediate hit, achieving 13.5 million viewers on its launch in 1997 and was sold to more than 200 countries worldwide. In 2001 Nettles guest-starred in an episode of Heartbeat playing fraudster Giles Sutton. In 2003 he played Barnaby in the Boxing Day episode of French & Saunders. In 2007 he appeared in the BBC Radio 4 comedy series Will Smith Presents the Tao of Bergerac, alongside comedian Will Smith, which was about an obsessive fan of the series.

In February 2009, it was announced that Nettles had decided to leave Midsomer Murders after two further series were made. His final appearance on-screen was on 2 February 2011, by which time he had appeared in 81 episodes. About his departure, he commented, "It’s always wise to leave people wanting more, rather than be booed off the stage because you bored them."

In 2016 and 2017, Nettles had a recurring role as Ray Penvenen in the second and third series of the popular historical drama Poldark.

Other television work
In 1982 Nettles was Raoul (the 4th man) in the Agatha Christie Hour story The Fourth Man.

In the 1990s Nettles narrated the BBC documentary X Cars following Greater Manchester Police's stolen car squad during the height of the UK wide joyriding crime wave.

Nettles narrated Wild Discovery in 1995 and the BBC documentary series Airport from 1996 to 2005.

In early 2010 Nettles wrote, presented and produced a three-part documentary, Channel Islands at War, to mark the 70th anniversary of the German invasion and subsequent occupation of the Channel Islands. He received threatening letters from some residents of Jersey, accusing him of implying that islanders were collaborators. He defended the documentary saying: "There is no possible way you could have avoided collaboration with the occupying power who had power over the civilian population. If you had not toed the line you would have been shot." This view was supported by local historians and members of the Channel Islands Occupation Society.

In 2020 Nettles took over as the narrator on the Channel 4 television show Devon and Cornwall, a sister show to the network's The Yorkshire Dales and the Lakes programme.

Books
During the filming of Bergerac, filmed on the island of Jersey, he wrote Bergerac's Jersey (BBC Books, 1988), a travel guide to filming locations in the series. He followed up with John Nettles' Jersey: A Personal View of the People and Places (BBC Books, 1992) about the island's landscape, personalities and history.

In 1991 he wrote the semi-autobiographical Nudity in a Public Place: Confessions of a Mini Celebrity (Robson Books) about becoming a "reluctant heartthrob" to female viewers of Bergerac. This was re-released as a Kindle version on Amazon in 2014 following the reruns of Bergerac on BBC2 as part of their afternoon nostalgia collection.

In 2012 Nettles wrote Jewels and Jackboots (Hardback ) about the German occupation of the Channel Islands. It sold out in a matter of weeks, and was republished in 2013 as a paperback and on Kindle.

In 2019 John Nettles published an edition of the diaries of Reverend Douglas Ord during the German occupation of Guernsey during World War. Nettles edited the diaries as well as writing an introduction.

Personal life
Nettles married his first wife, Joyce Middleton, in 1967. Their daughter, Emma Martins, was born in 1970, and moved to Jersey with her father for Bergerac. She joined the States of Jersey Police, working with officers who met her father during the show's filming. After Nettles's divorce, Joyce became a casting director for Midsomer Murders.

Nettles married his second wife, Cathryn Sealey, in July 1995 in Evesham, Worcestershire.

Honours
Nettles was appointed Officer of the Order of the British Empire (OBE) in the 2010 Birthday Honours.

Awards
In 2006 he received an honorary doctorate from the University of Southampton, from which he had graduated.

On 21 September 2012, Nettles was awarded an honorary doctorate by the University of Plymouth. He also agreed to be a patron of Devon charity The Mare and Foal Sanctuary in July 2014.

Filmography

References

External links

John Nettles, Official Website: www.john-nettles.com (under construction)

John Nettles at the British Film Institute
John Nettles (Aveleyman)

1943 births
Alumni of the University of Southampton
British historians
British male non-fiction writers
British male Shakespearean actors
British male stage actors
British male television actors
British people of Irish descent
Living people
Male actors from Cornwall
Officers of the Order of the British Empire
People educated at St Austell Grammar School
People from St Austell
Royal Shakespeare Company members